Barbara Tran (born 1968) is an American-born poet living in Canada. She received a Pushcart Prize in 1997.

Career
Born in New York City, Tran received her BA from New York University and her MFA from Columbia University. She coedited the anthology Watermark: Vietnamese American Poetry and Prose (Asian American Writers' Workshop, 1998) and guest edited Viet Nam: Beyond the Frame, a special issue of Michigan Quarterly Review (Fall 2004).

She is the recipient of a Lannan Foundation Writing Residency, Bread Loaf Writers' Conference Scholarship, MacDowell Colony Fellowship, and Pushcart Prize, and is featured in filmmaker Yunah Hong's documentary Between the Lines: Asian American Women's Poetry.

Her poems have appeared in the Women's Review of Books, Ploughshares, and The New Yorker, as well as in the Williams College Museum of Art exhibit The Moon Is Broken: Photography from Poetry, Poetry from Photography.

Tran's first poetry collection, In the Mynah Bird's Own Words (Tupelo Press, 2002), was selected by Robert Wrigley as the winner of Tupelo Press's chapbook competition, and was a PEN/Open Book Award finalist.

In fall 2015, Tran was a writer-in-residence at Hedgebrook. She lives in Toronto.

Awards and honors
Tran is a recipient of a Research and Creation grant and a Professional Development for Artists grant from the Canada Council, as well as a Literary Creation Project grant from the Ontario Arts Council.

She was longlisted for the 2018 CBC Nonfiction Prize.

Works 

 PEN/Open Book Award finalist.

References

External links

1968 births
American expatriates in Canada
New York University alumni
Columbia University School of the Arts alumni
Living people
Writers from New York City
American women poets
21st-century American poets
21st-century American women writers